Pont nou de la Margineda is a bridge in Santa Coloma d'Andorra, Andorra. 

It is a masonry bridge, consisting of a single granite arch, which was built on the Gran Valira river in the 1930s, a hundred metres from the medieval bridge of La Margineda. It has been classified as a monument of cultural interest since July 2004.

See also
List of bridges in Andorra

References

External links

Buildings and structures in Andorra la Vella
Bridges in Andorra
Cultural Heritage of Andorra